Berdejo is a municipality located in the province of Zaragoza, Aragon, Spain. According to the 2004 census (INE), the municipality had a population of 66 inhabitants.

Geography 
In ancient times, Berdejo was known by the names of Berdeio or Vergegium, which has led to the mistake of the birthplace of San Millán with Berceo. The municipality is crossed by the Manubles, a tributary of the Jalón River. From his church was San Millán priest about the year 560, when Torrelapaja was a district of Berdejo. Today the Church of San Millán is framed in the Arciprestazgo del Alto Jalón of the diocese of Tarazona. It is connected through the A-1502 road.

References 

Municipalities in the Province of Zaragoza